Tamijani Homayoon Toufighi (born March 21, 1990) is an Iranian chess grandmaster (2010).

Chess awards
Gold medal Asian championship under 18.
Silver medal Asian championship under 18
Bronze medal in Asian team championship India
Silver medal Asian team championship on board 5
Gold medal in Turkamenistan open
Gold medal Dubai open under 14
Gold medal Iran youth Championship under 10,12,14,16,18 and 20
Twice Iran blitz chess champion
Twice Iran Rapid chess champion 
Silver medal Asian Championship in Singapore under 14
Captain and player of the first board in Iran chess national team Olympiad under 16
8th GM in Iran

References

External links

OlimpBase

Iranian chess players
Chess grandmasters
Living people
1990 births
Chess players at the 2010 Asian Games
People from Rasht
Asian Games competitors for Iran
21st-century Iranian people